Liufau Tanielu Sonoma Unutoa (died August 4, 2009) was an American Samoan politician.

Sonoma served as high chief of the village of Aua, American Samoa. He also served in the American Samoa Senate. Sonoma worked as a meteorologist for the National Oceanic and Atmospheric Administration

Notes

Year of birth unknown
2009 deaths
American Samoan chiefs
American Samoa Senators
American meteorologists
National Oceanic and Atmospheric Administration personnel